Sir Robert Malpas, CBE FREng FRSA (born 9 August 1927) is a British engineer and businessman. Much of his career was spent with ICI. He was Chairman of ICI Europa Ltd and a member of the ICI Main Board before becoming a managing director of BP, Chairman of PowerGen and the Cookson Group, and Co-Chairman of Eurotunnel. 

In April 2018, Malpas was pushed onto the tracks at Marble Arch station where he suffered serious injuries. His attacker was sentenced to life in prison in June 2019.

Early life
The son of Cheshyre Malpas and his wife Louise Marie Marcelle Malpas, he was educated at Taunton School and St George's College, Quilmes, Argentina, and then at Durham University, where he read for a Mechanical engineering BSc degree, graduating with first-class honours.

Career
In 1948 Malpas joined Imperial Chemical Industries, remaining with the company until 1963. He then transferred to Alcudia SA, a Spanish company then almost half-owned by ICI, and in 1965 to ICI Europa Ltd, based in Brussels. He became Chairman of ICI Europa Ltd in 1973 and from 1975 to 1978 was a member of the ICI Main Board. From 1978 to 1982 he was President of Halcon International Inc., from 1983 to 1989 a Managing director of BP, from 1990 Chairman of PowerGen, from 1991 to 1998 Chairman of the Cookson Group, simultaneously serving as Co-Chairman of Eurotunnel from 1996 to 1998. From 1998 to 2002 he was Chairman of Ferghana Partners Ltd. He was also a director of Repsol SA (1989–2002), the BOC Group (1981–1996), Eurotunnel (1987–1999), Enagas, Spain (2002–2006), and Agcert PLC (2005–2008).

In retirement, he is chairman of the board of RL Automotive.

His book Energy for Planet Earth (1991), based on a series of articles which appeared in a special issue of Scientific American in 1990, considers the factors governing the way people use energy, dividing them into economic and social forces.

Voluntary work and private life
In 1956 Malpas married Josephine Dickenson. After her death in 2004 he married secondly, in 2005, Josephine's nurse, Joan Holloway.

He served as a Member of the Engineering Council from 1983 to 1988 and was its Vice-Chairman from 1984 to 1988; a member of the Advisory Council for Applied Research and Development, 1983–1986; Chairman of the LINK Steering Group, 1987–1993 and of the Natural Environment Research Council, 1993–1996. In Who's Who he states his recreations as "Sport, music, theatre, golf". Malpas was elected a member of the National Academy of Engineering in 1985 for substantial contributions to the industrial engineering community and to its relations with academe in England, Europe, and the United States. 

On 27 April 2018, Malpas was suddenly and without warning pushed onto the train tracks at Marble Arch tube station suffering a broken pelvis and a head wound. A bystander rescued him from the tracks, and the perpetrator, who was unknown to Malpas, was later found guilty of attempted murder and jailed for life. The incident was captured on CCTV.

In June 2021 Malpas was featured on an episode of 24 Hours in A&E, being treated at St George's Hospital, London, in Autumn 2020 after suffering from a low heart rate, dizziness and confusion, from which he recovered.

Publications
Energy for Planet Earth (1991)

Honours
Order of Civil Merit, Spain, 1967
Fellow of the Royal Academy of Engineering
Commander of the Order of the British Empire, 1975
Hon. Doctorate, University of Loughborough, 1983
Hon. Doctorate, University of Surrey, 1984
 Member, National Academy of Engineering, 1985 
Hon. Fellow of the Royal Society of Chemistry, 1988
Hon. Doctorate, University of Newcastle, 1991
Hon. DSc, University of Bath, 1991
Hon. Fellow, University of Westminster, 1992
Hon. Doctorate, University of Durham, 1997
Knight Bachelor, 1998
Hon. FIMechE, 1999
Hon. Doctorate, Sheffield Hallam University, 2001

Notes

1927 births
People educated at Taunton School
People educated at St. George's College, Quilmes
English mechanical engineers
Knights Bachelor
Commanders of the Order of the British Empire
Order of Civil Merit members
Living people
Alumni of King's College, Newcastle